is a Japanese musical composer, guitarist and vocalist of doa under Giza Studio label since 2004. He was a guitarist of rock bands Baad (1992–1999) and Rad Hammer (1999–2002).

Biography
In 1991, he successfully passed BAD (Being Artist Development) audition.
In 1992, he debuted with rock band Baad who performed big anime theme song Kimi ga Suki da to Sakebitai which was used as an opening theme for Anime television series Slam Dunk. With the beginning of the band's second period in 1996, Shinichiro has become the main composer of the band. Aside from band activities, he provided backing vocals for several artist such as a Zard, T-Bolan and Wands. In 1999, the Baad has disbanded and formed new indies band Rad Hammer with one of former members of Baad, Seiki Takayama. Red Hammer didn't last long as disbanded in 2002 due to unknown reasons. From 2003 to 2008, he was a regular support member as a guitarist and back vocalist during B'z's and later Zard live concerts. In 2004, he formed a new rock band Doa with Akihito Tokunaga and Daiki Yoshimoto in which three of them are the vocalist and are active as of 2019. In 2006, he made his debut as a composer as his name was credited in Aya Kamiki's debut album Secret Code. Aside from current band activities, since 2006 he has been active as a soloist with live tour series Singin'man's Bandwagon.

List of participated works as a backing vocalist
His name appears in booklet page of staff credits. In the 1990s he was credited from Baad and since 04 he's credited as from Doa

Zard
Today Is Another Day
Eien
Toki no Tsubasa
Omohide
Tooi Hoshi wo Kazoete
Hitomi Tojite
Kakegae no Nai Mono
Kyō wa Yukkuri Hanasō
Kimi to no Distance
Tomatteita Tokei ga Ima Ugokidashita
Ai wo Shinjiteitai (2007 Ver.)

Wands
Little Bit…

T-Bolan
Heart of Stone

Kaori Nanao
Nanao (album)

Koshi Inaba
Peace of Mind

Tak Matsumoto Group
OH JAPAN: OUR TIME IS NOW

B'z
Monster
Action
Ocean
Super Love Song

Ai Takaoka
Omoide no Natsu ga Kuru
Anata no Kokoro Haremasuyouni

U-ka Saegusa in dB
U-ka saegusa IN db IV ~Crystal na Kisetsu ni Miserarete~

See also
Baad
Doa

References

External links
Official profile 
Baad official website 
Rad Hammer official website 

1967 births
Being Inc. artists
Japanese composers
Japanese male composers
Living people